Eureka is the first singer-songwriter album by Jim O'Rourke, originally released on February 25, 1999 by Drag City. It is named after the Nicolas Roeg film of the same name. NME named it the 16th best album of 1999. In 2012, Fact placed it at number 24 on the "100 Best Albums of the 1990s" list.

Track listing

Personnel
Credits adapted from liner notes.
 Jim O'Rourke – vocals, guitar, bass guitar, piano, organ, synthesizer, bells
 Brian Calvin – backing vocals (1)
 Jeff Stafford – backing vocals (1)
 Jennifer Peterson – backing vocals (1)
 Maureen Loughnane – backing vocals (1)
 Edith Frost – backing vocals (6)
 Teria Gartelos – backing vocals (6)
 Julie Pomerleau – violin (1, 3, 4, 6), viola (1, 3, 4, 6)
 Fred Lonberg-Holm – cello (1, 4, 5)
 Joan Morrone – French horn (2, 5, 8)
 Jeb Bishop – trombone (3, 5, 6, 7)
 Rob Mazurek – cornet (3, 5)
 Bob Weston – trumpet (3, 7)
 Mike Colligan – clarinet (4)
 Ken Vandermark – saxophone (4)
 Richard Skabbs – organ (1)
 Darin Gray – bass guitar (2, 5, 8)
 Ken Champion – pedal steel guitar (2, 5, 8), piano (2, 5, 8)
 Rian Murphy – drums (4)
 Glenn Kotche – drums (1, 2, 5, 8), percussion (3)
 Tim Barnes – percussion (1, 2, 5)
 Steve Butters – percussion (4)

References

External links
 

1999 albums
Jim O'Rourke (musician) albums
Drag City (record label) albums
Domino Recording Company albums
P-Vine Records albums